"So in Love with You" is a 1994 song released by British singer, songwriter and producer Mark Carson Adams under the name Duke. It is his biggest hit and was included on his 1995 album, The 10 Commandments Of Love. The single's radio edit is mixed by Norman Cook, as Pizzaman. It reached number three in the Netherlands and number 12 in Flemish Belgium. The track has since been remixed and re-released several times; in 1996, 2000, 2001 and 2012. The 1996 version peaked at number four in Italy and number 22 on the UK Singles Chart, while reaching number two on the UK Dance Singles Chart. In 1997, it peaked at number-one on the Billboard Hot Dance Music/Club Play chart in the US. A music video was also produced to promote the single, featuring the singer performing it wearing a white suit.

Critical reception
Larry Flick from Billboard described "So in Love with You" as a "vibrant disco ditty", noting that Duke "brings a friendly vibe to the song with a voice that is actually better suited to pop airwaves than underground dance-floors—though there's plenty here for club kids to nosh on". Pan-European magazine Music & Media stated that "falsettos are rare. Here's the first convincing high-pitched male pop singer since Jimmy Somerville. Duke has apparently listened a lot to Marvin Gaye's What's Going On." Upon the 1995 re-release, they wrote that the song "with its mid-tempo romanticism is one of those songs that sound awfully familiar, even though it's the first time you hear them." 

A reviewer from Music Weeks RM Dance Update said it is "a great track in its own right — lots of Latin flavour topped with Duke's cool vocals". In 1996, Music Week rated it four out of five, noting that it is "evoking the infectious vibes of War's Low Rider and the vocal splendour of Marvin Gaye." The magazine's James Hamilton declared it as a "simply marvellous Marvin Gaye/William DeVaughn-ish falsetto soulful European smash with a madly infectious summery humming 'la-la-la-la-la na' refrain". In 1997, editor Alan Jones wrote, "Hopefully we'll catch on this time, since it's a funkily soulful groove, with a bassline reminiscent of Sub Sub's Ain't No Use, elements of Freakpower's Turn On... and a sweet vocal not far removed from Marvin Gaye's Got To Give It Up. A good radio record."

Track listing
 CD single, Netherlands"So in Love with You" (Pizzaman Radio Friendly Vibe) – 3:58
"So in Love with You" (Accapella) – 3:53

 CD maxi, Europe'
"So in Love with You" (Pizzaman Radio Friendly Vibe) – 3:56
"So in Love with You" (Pizzaman House Vocal) – 7:40
"So in Love with You" (Pizzaman 5 AM Dub) – 7:02
"So in Love with You" (Pizzaman House Dub) – 7:28

Charts

Weekly charts

Year-end charts

References

1994 debut singles
1995 singles
1996 singles
1997 singles
1994 songs
CNR Music singles
Eurodance songs
House music songs
Virgin Records singles